"Dancing Barefoot" is a rock song written by Patti Smith and Ivan Král, and released as a second single from the Patti Smith Group's 1979 album Wave. According to the album sleeve, the song was dedicated to women such as Amedeo Modigliani's mistress Jeanne Hébuterne.

In 1998, the song featured on the soundtrack of Whatever, a coming of age film starring Liza Weil.

In 2000, a live version was released on the benefit album Broadcasts Vol. 8 from KGSR in Austin, Texas.

In 2010, the song ranked number 331 on Rolling Stones list of "The 500 Greatest Songs of All Time".

Cover versions
 1986 – Niki Mono & Berry Sakharof (Fuck Your Dreams, This Is Heaven soundtrack)
 1986 – The Feelies
 1986 – The Mission (Extra track on The Mission II, a 12-inch single released in July 1986. Also included on The First Chapter album released in 1987.) 
 1987 – Eastern Bloc ("Eastern Bloc")
 1988 – The Celibate Rifles (12-inch EP, bonus track on reissued CD version of Roman Beach Party)
 1989 – U2 (B-side to the "When Love Comes to Town" single, also on the compilation The Best of 1980–1990; features on the soundtrack of the 1994 movie Threesome; reached number one in Iceland in early 1995)
 1991 – Xymox (Phoenix)
 1995 – Johnette Napolitano (Spirit of '73: Rock for Choice)
 1997 – Die Cheerleader (Barb Wire soundtrack)
 1998 – Sin ("Insinuation")
 2001 – Simple Minds (Neon Lights)
 2004 –  (The Stolen Child) 
 2005 – Lea DeLaria (Double Standards)
 2008 – Allison Moorer (Mockingbird)
 2010 – Pearl Jam (Performed at Bridge School Benefit October 23, 2010)
 2010 - Spencer P. Jones & the Escape Committee (Sobering Thoughts)
 2011 – Shakespears Sister (Cosmic Dancer)
 2011 – First Aid Kit (Performed for Patti Smith at the Polar Music Prize 2011 during the award ceremony)
 2014 - Simple Minds (Big Music, bonus track, featuring Sarah Brown)

 2017 - Simple Minds (Acoustic In Concert)
 2021 - DireSloth, played live on the main stage at the 38th Boston Freedom Rally

References

External links

1979 singles
Patti Smith songs
U2 songs
Allison Moorer songs
Shakespears Sister songs
Songs written by Patti Smith
Songs written by Ivan Kral
Song recordings produced by Todd Rundgren
Songs with feminist themes
Arista Records singles
Number-one singles in Iceland
1979 songs